Plaza is a Spanish word for a city square; it may more specifically refer to:

People
 Plaza (surname)
 Plaza (singer), Canadian Michael Martin Kaminski

Communities

United States
 Plaza, Long Beach, California, a neighborhood
 Plaza, Washington, an unincorporated community in Spokane County
 Plaza, North Dakota, a city in Mountrail County

Other countries
 Płaza, a village in Małopolska, Poland
 Plaza, Venezuela, a municipality in the state of Miranda

Buildings
 Plaza Apartments (disambiguation)
 Plaza Building (disambiguation)
 Plaza Hotel (disambiguation)
 Plaza Theatre (disambiguation)

Other uses
Plaza (album), a 2016 album by American psychedelic indie rock band Quilt
Plymouth Plaza, an automobile sold in North America during the late 1950s.

See also
The Plaza (disambiguation)
La Plaza (disambiguation)